The following chart compares websites that provide United States credit reports or credit scores free of charge. Services limited to cardholders or only offering trial plans are excluded. The chart specifies what is free, what kind of credit reports are included, and whether a full Social Security number is needed.

According to the Federal Trade Commission, "AnnualCreditReport.com is the only authorized source for the free annual credit report." Care should be taken when providing a full Social Security number to any other website.

See also
 Credit score in the United States
 Criticism of credit scoring systems in the United States
 Fair Credit Reporting Act

References

Credit